The Danville Branch, National Home for Disabled Volunteer Soldiers Historic District is the historic campus of a branch of the National Home for Disabled Volunteer Soldiers in Danville, Illinois. The branch, which opened in 1898, was one of eleven branches of the National Home, which formed in 1867 to treat Union soldiers disabled during the Civil War. U.S. Representative and Danville resident Joseph Gurney Cannon used his political influence to establish the Danville Branch, which brought money and jobs to the city. The campus served as both a medical facility and a planned community for the area's veterans, and it included housing, veteran-run shops, community halls, a school and library, and a chapel. Most of these buildings were designed in the Georgian Revival style; however, the library is a Classical Revival building, and the chapel has a Gothic Revival design. The campus also includes the Danville National Cemetery. The buildings remaining on the campus are presently divided between Danville's Veterans Affairs hospital and the Danville Area Community College.

The campus was added to the National Register of Historic Places on January 30, 1992.

References

External links

Georgian Revival architecture in Illinois
Neoclassical architecture in Illinois
Gothic Revival architecture in Illinois
Buildings and structures completed in 1898
Buildings and structures in Danville, Illinois
Veterans Affairs medical facilities
Old soldiers' homes in the United States
Historic districts on the National Register of Historic Places in Illinois
National Register of Historic Places in Vermilion County, Illinois
1898 establishments in Illinois